Colonel General Abdul-Wahab al-Saadi or Saedi is the head of the Iraqi Counter-Terrorism Service (ICTS).

Early life and education
Al-Saadi is born in 1963 in Al-Thawra District, Baghdad. 

Al-Saadi graduated from the University of Mosul in Northern Iraq with a bachelor's degree in physics. He then graduated from the Iraqi Military College with a rank of lieutenant, then graduated from the Iraqi Military Joint Staff College in 1996.

Career 

Al-Saadi has been the overall operation's commander of Iraqi government forces in Battle of Baiji (2014–15), Second Battle of Tikrit, and Third Battle of Fallujah (2016), the Hawija offensive (2017) in the war against ISIL.
 
Peter Bergen wrote that al-Saadi played a critical role in the overall defeat of ISIS in Iraq.
 
In September 2019, al-Saadi was removed from his office as second-in-command of ICTS by then Iraqi Prime Minister Adel Abdul Mahdi and transferred to work in the Ministry of Defense, without mentioning the reasons for the decision. Al-Saadi said that the decision was at the request of the head of the Counter-Terrorism Agency, General Talib Shaghati and that it was considered "insulting to him and his military history." Many politicians, media and activists considered the decision unfair. The firing could be considered one of the reasons for protests that escalated into street clashes resulting in thousands of deaths. On 10 May 2020, newly appointed prime minister Mustafa Al-Kadhimi promoted him to lead the counterterrorism service.

References

 
 

Iraqi generals
People from Baghdad
Living people
University of Mosul alumni
1963 births
People from Baghdad Province
People of the War in Iraq (2013–2017)